Alexandre Cuvillier (born 17 June 1986 in Cucq) is a French football midfielder.

Career
Cuvillier began his career at Stade de Reims. In 2008, he joined Ligue 2 side US Boulogne.

After retiring from football, he moved to Canada to pursue other projects. In 2021, he returned to the sport, joining AS Blainville, where he will play for the first team in the third-tier Première Ligue de soccer du Québec, as well as coach their U17 team.

References

External links 
 Profile on Foot Mercato
 
 

Living people
1986 births
French footballers
Ligue 1 players
Ligue 2 players
Stade de Reims players
US Boulogne players
AS Nancy Lorraine players
RC Lens players
Stade Malherbe Caen players
People from Cucq
Association football midfielders
Sportspeople from Pas-de-Calais
Footballers from Hauts-de-France